Lijndenia greenwayi is a species of plant in the family Melastomataceae. It is endemic to Tanzania.

References

Endemic flora of Tanzania
greenwayi
Vulnerable plants
Taxonomy articles created by Polbot